is an English contract law case concerning the principle of privity of contract and consideration. Its panel of appeal judges reinforced that the doctrine of privity meant that only those who are party to an agreement (outside of one of the well-established exceptional relationships such as agency, bailment or trusteeship) may sue or be sued on it and established the principle that "consideration must flow from the promisee".

Facts
John Tweddle and William Guy mutually agreed in writing to pay sums of money (£100 and £200, respectively) to Tweddle's son William (who was engaged to Guy's daughter). Guy then died before payment, and when the estate would not pay, William Tweddle then sued Mr Atkinson, the executor of Guy's estate, for the promised £200.

Judgment
The court held that the suit would not succeed as no stranger to the consideration may enforce a contract, although made for his benefit. The court ruled that a promisee cannot bring an action unless the consideration of the promisee moved to him. Consideration must move from party entitled to sue upon the contract. No legal entitlement is conferred on third parties to an agreement. Third parties to a contract do not derive any rights from that agreement nor are they subject to any burdens imposed by it.  It was left unanswered if the groom's father could have successfully sued the estate instead.

Critique
The case's summary of the doctrine of privity in the common law was upheld in Dunlop v Selfridge (1915) and Beswick v Beswick (1967), but it was frequently criticised for obstructing the wishes of the contracting parties. The two fathers intended that the sums should be paid to the groom, and their wishes were defeated. (Note that this case preceded the Married Women's Property Act 1882, which enabled married women to retain their property.) In the 1930s the Law Reform Committee proposed amendment of the doctrine but World War II intervened and nothing was done. Many legal devices exist to circumvent the doctrines (such as the use of negotiable instruments), the greatest being the Contracts (Rights of Third Parties) Act 1999 which allows, in general, a beneficiary or an identified third party to enforce terms to its benefit in a contract made by others.

References

See also

 English contract law
 Intention
 Promise

1861 in case law
1861 in England
Lord Blackburn cases
English enforceability case law
English privity case law
1861 in British law
Court of King's Bench (England) cases